Anatoly Anatolyevich Komm ; (born 26 January 1967 in Moscow) is a Russian chef and restaurateur. He is the first Russian to have an establishment (his restaurant Green) listed in the Michelin Guide.

Biography 
Komm was born in Moscow in 1967. After studying geophysics, he began working in the computer business. He then moved to fashion, traveling all over Europe. Komm’s first restaurant, Green, was opened in 2001 in Moscow. He later started Club Progressive Daddy and the restaurants Твербуль (Tverbul) and Варвары (Barbarians), where traditional Russian and Soviet cuisine (e.g. borsch, pelmeni, olivier salad) is served in the molecular style. 

In February 2013, Komm - in partnership with Alexei Nagornov, head of the Ural entertainment company Sweet Life Corporation - opened Ресторан №1 (Restaurant No. 1), a "Brasserie De Luxe" in Yekaterinburg. Its cuisine is based on products of the Urals.

References

External links
 Official site

1967 births
Russian chefs
Russian restaurateurs
Head chefs of Michelin starred restaurants
Living people
Businesspeople from Moscow